Yazıkaya is a village in the Çayırlı District, Erzincan Province, Turkey. The village had a population of 251 in 2021. The hamlet of Dilek is attached to it.

References 

Villages in Çayırlı District